Jack Cruise (15 August 1915 – 4 May 1979) was a famous Irish comedian and actor, who performed in and wrote many shows in the Royal and Olympia theatres in Dublin.

Early life

Born in Phibsboro, Dublin to Michael Cruise (b. Colchester, Essex 1865) & Brigid O’Kelly (b. Tralee, Co. Kerry 1880). He attended St. Vincent's C.B.S. Glasnevin. Leaving secondary school in 1933 he joined the well-known Dublin bakers, Peter Kennedy & Sons as a trainee ledger clerk. He had been interested in acting and drama from an early age and he joined the A.O.H. Players in 1934 and played with many of the leading amateur drama groups in the city in the following years. In 1936 while performing in the pantomime ‘Jack & the Beanstalk’ with the Fr. Matthew Players he created what was to become one of his favourite characters – John Joe Mahockey from Ballyslapdashamuckery – an astute countryman or Culchie to use the Dublin expression, who wore a flat cap with an enormous peak, navy blue suit, white shirt, red tie and a large pair of brown hobnailed boots. 

Jack was a first cousin of the Irish portrait painter Leo Whelan.

Queens Theatre

He performed initially in the Queens Theater and while appearing there  he was recommended to Noel Purcell, then a Theatre Royal star. Shortly afterwards he began performing and writing scripts for the weekly variety shows the Royal was renowned for.

Theatre Royal

He eventually left Kennedys bakery in 1945 to work full-time in The Theatre Royal where he had been appointed house manager and press officer. That Christmas he played in the Pantomime ‘Mother Goose’ with Noel Purcell, Eddie Byrne, Frankie Blowers, Sean Mooney and Pauline Forbes whose father Dick wrote the show. The show also featured The Royalettes and the Theatre’s orchestra conducted by Jimmy Campbell. In the five weeks run it was seen by 231,000 citizens. It was described by Dublin Theatre critic John Finegan as ‘Dublin’s greatest panto’.  
He performed in the Theatre Royal regularly up to the late 1940s when theatrical work in the city took a downturn. He returned to the Royal in the early 1950s and performed regularly until its closure in 1962.

In the Royal Theatre's 1951/52 offering, Robinson Crusoe which opened on 23 December, the production featured Eddie Byrne as Captain Hook (a bad bad pirate), Jack Cruise and Harry Bailey as Wette and Windee (two old salts) and Noel Purcell as Ma Crusoe (a merry widow). With eighteen named players plus the Royalettes and assorted specialty acts, the eleven scene presentation took the Irish Clipper to Neptune’s Domain and the Island of Golden Palms, thereby allowing Ma Crusoe to discover the Lollipop Tree.

He set up his own import-export agency until a new opportunity presented itself. In 1948, Sir William Heygate Edmund Colborne "Billy" Butlin opened his Irish holiday camp in Mosney Co.Meath. Three years later Jack was offered the summer variety season there and for the following eight years he produced 80 different shows for the patrons.

Olympia Theatre

The Olympia Theatre closed between February 1964 and August 1964. It had been sold
to a group of London-Irish publicans who had an idea of converting it into a
cabaret-restaurant. The Corporation refused and Jack Cruise, Lorcan Bourke, Richard Hallinan and founder of The Dublin Theatre Festival, Brendan Smith took over the Theater on a six months lease. The first show was a revue
"Holiday Hayride" with Jack Cruise which did better business than any other show in the
history of the Olympia up until that time.

Some of the pantomimes he directed at the Olympia were :
 Aladdin (1964)
 Jack in the Box. Jack Cruise (1970)
 Aladdin and the Wonderful Lamp: Jack Cruise Productions (1972)
 Cinderella: Jack Cruise Productions
 Ring Out the Bells: Jack Cruise Productions

Jack Cruise on the Late Late Show 1976.

Latter Years.

Jack Cruise was one of the last performers to survive the impact of T.V. Managing the successful Holiday Hayride productions throughout the 60's &70's.His final production was the Panto Aladdin at the Olympia Theatre Christmas 1978.In 1979 he had agreed to produce and appear in Summer revue in Butlins Mosney he passed away on May 1979 .As with the old theatre adage 'The show must go on ' Dublin Comedian Danny Cummins stood on for Jack and the shows in Butlins went ahead .

References

1915 births
1979 deaths
Irish male comedians
Irish male stage actors
Pantomime
20th-century male actors from Northern Ireland
20th-century Irish comedians
People educated at St. Vincent's C.B.S., Glasnevin